DatabaseSpy is a multi-database query, design, and database comparison tool from Altova, the creator of XMLSpy. DatabaseSpy connects to many major relational databases, facilitating SQL querying, database structure design, database content editing, and database comparison and conversion.

DatabaseSpy is a database client application for Windows 7, 8, and 10, Windows XP, and Windows Server 2003 and 2008 that allows database administrators, database developers, and other database-oriented IT professionals to interact with multiple relational databases that may have been created by different developers.

DatabaseSpy features include a quick connection wizard for multiple relational databases, SQL editor with auto-completion, graphical database design tool, database content and schema comparison, and data import and export in multiple formats. DatabaseSpy also includes special support for XML in databases and is available in 32-bit and 64-bit versions.

Supported databases 

DatabaseSpy can connect to multiple databases simultaneously, including databases of different types. DatabaseSpy automatically adjusts to variations in SQL dialects and data type definitions of supported relational databases. DatabaseSpy connects to the following major database types:

 Microsoft SQL Server 
 PostgreSQL 
 Oracle 
 MySQL 
 IBM Db2 
 IBM Db2 for i
 Informix 
 Sybase ASE 
 Microsoft Access 
 MicroSoft Azure SQL
 MariaDB
 SQLite 
Firebird 
  Progress OpenEdge
 Teradata
 And others

User comments 

From its initial release in September 2006, users have recognized the benefits of using a single tool with a consistent user interface to multiple databases to perform routine tasks such as querying or modifying tables.

The use of a common graphical interface to connect to multiple databases, possibly across different platforms, is cited as a valuable feature.

Licensing 

DatabaseSpy is a licensed software product that uses key protection to prevent unlicensed usage. DatabaseSpy is free to try with a no-cost 30-day trial license.

See also 
Comparison of database tools

References

External links 
 Altova website

Database administration tools
PL/SQL editors
Sybase